The Capt. Thomas Blanch House was a historic house at 130 Tappan Road in Norwood, Bergen County, New Jersey, United States. The house was built in 1790 and was added to the National Register of Historic Places on January 10, 1983. The house was destroyed by fire on May 26, 1997.

See also
National Register of Historic Places listings in Bergen County, New Jersey

References

Houses on the National Register of Historic Places in New Jersey
Houses completed in 1790
Houses in Bergen County, New Jersey
National Register of Historic Places in Bergen County, New Jersey
Norwood, New Jersey
Burned houses in the United States
New Jersey Register of Historic Places